Gilbert Allen McKenzie (27 May 1915 – 26 May 1941) was a New Zealand disabled artist and entertainer. He was born in Invercargill, Southland, New Zealand on 27 May 1915 and died on 26 May 1941, a day before his 26th birthday.

References

1915 births
1941 deaths
New Zealand artists
People from Invercargill
Artists with disabilities